Oru Cinemakkaran is a 2017 Indian Malayalam-language feature film written and directed by Leo Thaddeus, starring Vineeth Sreenivasan in lead role with Rajisha Vijayan, Anusree, Vijay Babu, Prashant Narayanan, Renji Panicker, Lal, Joy Mathew and Sasi Kalinga in supporting roles.

The film was released on 24 June with mixed reviews.

Plot

Alby is an assistant director and is trying to make a name in the Malayalam film industry. He is in a relationship with Sara. Alby's father, a Jacobite priest, isn't keen on him trying to make a name in the film industry and also isn't very keen on his relationship with Sara. Sara's father, is a hooligan from Mattancherry and has fixed a marriage with her and an Italian-Indian, Gonzalves. Sara defies this and marries Alby. There he steals from a neighbor tenant Sudheer and to avoid defamation he murders him, the spur of the moment crime affects him and his family life. But, in an unbelievable twist Alby's misfortune changes and his deciding moment as a filmmaker happens.

Cast

Soundtrack
Music: Bijibal, Lyrics: Santhosh Varma, Rafeeq Ahamed, B. K. Harinarayanan

 "Angotto Ingotto" - Bijibal
 "Ozhukiyozhuki" - Haricharan, Shweta Mohan
 "Chirakukalaayi" - Arun Alat
 "Kannaake Mazhavillu" - Vineeth Sreenivasan, Teenu Tellence

References

External links
 

2017 films
2010s Malayalam-language films
Indian romantic thriller films
Films scored by Bijibal
2010s romantic thriller films